Mohd Sayuti Mohd Zahit (born 6 April 1984) is a Malaysian former professional racing cyclist, who currently works as the team manager for UCI Continental team .

Major results
2007
 4th Overall Melaka Chief Minister Cup
2011
 4th Road race, National Road Championships
 9th Melaka Chief Minister Cup

References

External links

1984 births
Living people
Malaysian people of Malay descent
Malaysian male cyclists